Major Mohommed Ali Shah is an Indian actor. A former soldier, he is a member of the board of the  International Film and Entertainment Festival of Australia who gave him an award.

Early life
Shah is the son of Lt. Gen. Zameer Uddin Shah (Retd.) and the nephew of actor Naseeruddin Shah.

Career

Army
Md Ali Shah attended the Officers Training Academy, Chennai.
Earlier Shah worked at a call centre and then took a commission in the Indian Army as per family tradition. As a young lieutenant, Shah was deployed on the Line of Control in Jammu and Kashmir. He was promoted to captain and was transferred on assignment as the ADC to the General Officer Commanding in the North East his father. Thereafter, he was promoted to the rank of major while posted with the Assam Rifles. He worked for Doordarshan as a television commentator for the fourth CISM Military World Games held at Hyderabad in 2007. His army service totalled five years.

Corporate career
After leaving the army, Shah studied marketing at the Indian Institute of Management Calcutta. He has worked for Genpact and Mahindra & Mahindra Ltd.

Theatre
 The "Major" Actor's Assorted Monologues
 The Inspector General

Film career
Shah has acted in the films Sriram Raghavan's Agent Vinod, Vishal Bhardwaj's Haider and Tigmanshu Dhulia's Yaara. He acted in a film based on the life of Majaz Lucknawi and played a character on the Doordarshan National television series, Dil Aashna Hai. He has featured in an advertisement. He won the " Best Actor" award for an English film at the 4th Delhi International Film Festival.

Filmography

Honours and awards

Film Awards

Personal life
In 2012, Shah helped campaign against a private airline's alleged gross misconduct to prove a point that customers are aware of their rights.

References

External links
 

1979 births
Living people
Indian people of Pashtun descent
Muhammed Ali Shah
Male actors from Kolkata
Actors from Mumbai